Cloticasone is a synthetic glucocorticoid corticosteroid which was never marketed.

References

Diketones
Diols
Fluoroarenes
Glucocorticoids
Organochlorides
Pregnanes